Locksmith Animation Ltd. (also known as Locksmith Animation Studios or Locksmith Studios and simply known as Locksmith) is a British CGI animation film studio founded by Aardman Animations collaborators Sarah Smith and Julie Lockhart with the financial backing of Elisabeth Murdoch on 2014. Based in London, England, Locksmith bills itself as "the UK’s only dedicated high-end CG feature animation studio dedicated to making films for a global family audience."

The company's logo depicts a blue shaped right-tilted keyhole with a white shaped keyhole inside.

Locksmith Animation's first film Ron's Gone Wrong was released on October 22, 2021, distributed by 20th Century Studios (which had recently been acquired by Disney two years prior) with generally positive reviews. Its next film is That Christmas, a holiday film based on filmmaker Richard Curtis' children's book series, distributed by Netflix, an untitled original musical-comedy film, Wed Wabbit, a live-action/animated hybrid film based on Lissa Evans' children's book, both distributed by Warner Bros. Pictures, and The Lunar Chronicles, An animated feature film adaptation based on the author Marissa Meyer's four young adult science fiction fantasy novels by the same name, distributed by Universal Pictures.

History
Locksmith was founded on 2014 by Aardman Animations collaborators Sarah Smith and Julie Lockhart with the financial backing of Elisabeth Murdoch, the studio was named after Julie Lockhart and Sarah Smith's last names. In April 2014, visual effects studio Double Negative (now known as DNEG) formed a deal with Locksmith where it will provide the CGI animation for Locksmith's films, this was before DNEG's animation division, DNEG Feature Animation (now known as DNEG Animation) was founded.

In May 2016, Locksmith formed a production deal with Paramount Pictures, with Paramount acting as the distributor for Locksmith's films to be produced under the Paramount Animation label. The following year, however, Paramount abandoned its deal with Locksmith when Paramount chairman and CEO Brad Grey was replaced by Jim Gianopulos.

In September 2017, Locksmith formed a multi-year production deal with 20th Century Fox, which would distribute Locksmith's films; 20th Century Fox Animation was brought in to oversee the deal, as Locksmith was aiming to release a film every 12–18 months. The first film to be released under the production company was Ron's Gone Wrong, which was released on October 22, 2021 by 20th Century Studios. In October 2019, while Disney took over 20th Century Animation, Locksmith formed a new multi-year production deal with Warner Bros., which will distribute future Locksmith films under the Warner Animation Group label after the release of Ron's Gone Wrong, which was now the only Locksmith film to be distributed by 20th Century Studios.

With the release of Ron's Gone Wrong in October 2021, Sister Pictures became the parent of Locksmith Animation since Elisabeth Murdoch is the President of Production of the studio.

In June 2021, it was announced that Natalie Fischer, the former COO of Illumination Entertainment, will step in as CEO. Locksmith co-founder Sarah Smith exits the company to pursue her own creative endeavours. It was also announced that Locksmith is currently in production on That Christmas (previously known as The Empty Stocking), a holiday film based on filmmaker Richard Curtis' children's book series, and Wed Wabbit, a live-action/animated hybrid film based on Lissa Evans' children's book, serve as the first live-action/animated hybrid film from Locksmith, and working on an original musical-comedy film. That Christmas was unveiled in June 2022 as part of Netflix's slate of animated films.

In January 2022, Locksmith had optioned to adapt Marissa Meyer's fantasy novel series The Lunar Chronicles.

Filmography

Feature films

Released

Upcoming

Accolades

Annie Awards

British Animation Awards

Notes

References

External links
 

2014 establishments in England
British companies established in 2014
British animation studios
Film production companies of the United Kingdom